The Plover River is a river in the U.S. state of Wisconsin.

It is a tributary of the Wisconsin River as the Plover River originates near Aniwa in extreme southern Langlade County and flows through Marathon County, then into Portage County.

The Plover River flows through Hatley and Stevens Point before it converges into the Wisconsin River in Whiting just above Plover.

References

External links 
 USGS Current Conditions for the Plover River

Rivers of Wisconsin
Bodies of water of Portage County, Wisconsin
Rivers of Langlade County, Wisconsin
Rivers of Marathon County, Wisconsin